Karasovo is a rural locality (a village) and the administrative center of Parfyonovskoye Rural Settlement, Velikoustyugsky District, Vologda Oblast, Russia. The population was 250 as of 2002.

Geography 
Karasovo is located 15 km southeast of Veliky Ustyug (the district's administrative centre) by road. Verkhneye Gribtsovo is the nearest rural locality.

References 

Rural localities in Velikoustyugsky District